Zeynep Tuğçe Bayat (born 8 February 1990) is a Turkish actress. She is known for her role as "Targun Hatun" in Kuruluş: Osman and series Afili Aşk, Baba, Çilek Kokusu.

Biography
Bayat was born in Mersin. Through generations of her family is nomad Turkmen in Taurus Mountains. Her surname "Bayat" is the one of 12 Oğuz tribes . After, she graduated law at Marmara University. She graduated from theatre department of Anadolu University State Conservatory. During her university education, she worked behind the scenes in private theatres, which led to her even winning an award for one of her plays called Closer. She went to Spain to study acting at a higher level after a period of internship. Zeynep went on the TV screens for the first time in a series called Beyaz Gelincik, which was broadcast in 2006 and is now starring in the popular Turkish TV series, Kuruluş: Osman.

Personal life 
On 24 August 2020, she married the Turkish actor Cansel Elçin.

Filmography

Theatre

Discography

Awards and nominations

References

External links

1990 births
Living people
People from Mersin
Marmara University alumni
Turkish film actresses
Turkish television actresses
21st-century Turkish actresses